Ardderry Lough is a freshwater lake in the west of Ireland. It is located in the Connemara area of County Galway.

Geography

Natural history
Fish species in Ardderry Lough include perch, brown trout and the critically endangered European eel. Ardderry Lough is part of the Connemara Bog Complex Special Area of Conservation.

See also
List of loughs in Ireland

References

Ardderry